Colorado Springs supports a diverse range of radio, television, and newspapers.

Print
The Colorado Catholic Herald, monthly, published by the Roman Catholic Diocese of Colorado Springs
The Colorado Springs Business Journal, weekly
Colorado Springs Independent, weekly
The Gazette, daily
Hispania News, weekly
The Westside Pioneer, bi-monthly
The Front Range Voluntaryist, monthly

Television
As of 2018 the Colorado Springs-Pueblo market was the 87th largest television market in the United States. The following is a list of over-the-air television stations serving the greater Colorado Springs metropolitan area.

Radio
As of 2018, Colorado Springs is the 89th largest radio market in the United States.  In addition to traditional AM and FM analog radio stations, there are 22 digital HD Radio channels.  The following is a list of radio stations serving the greater Colorado Springs metropolitan area:

AM

FM

See also 
 List of newspapers in Colorado
 List of television stations in Colorado

References 

Colorado Springs
 
 
 
Colorado Springs